.st is the Internet country code top-level domain (ccTLD) for São Tomé and Príncipe.  The code is marketed worldwide as an abbreviation for various entities.

Second-level domains 
Registrations are taken directly at the second level, but some names have been reserved for use in specialized third-level registrations (though not all of these are actually in use at present):

 nic.st: Official ST domain registry (older: registry.st)
 gov.st: Government of São Tomé and Príncipe
 saotome.st: Island of São Tomé
 principe.st: Island of Príncipe
 consulado.st: São Tomé and Príncipe consulates
 embaixada.st: São Tomé and Príncipe embassies
 org.st: non-profit organisations
 edu.st: educational institutions
 net.st: network providers/operators, ISPs
 com.st: commercial entities
 store.st
 mil.st: Armed Forces of São Tomé and Príncipe
 co.st

Other uses 
The .st domain is being marketed as a general-use domain, with a number of meanings suggested, including the abbreviation of "street", "state", short for "Star Trek" and more. The .st domain is also commonly used to create domain names that spell words ending in st, such as bur.st or ho.st. It is used for URL shortening domains like The Washington Post's wapo.st, and PlayStation's play.st.

Smalltalk 
The Smalltalk programming language uses the .st extension, and several websites about it use the .st domain.

Styria 
The state of Styria, in Austria, has ST as its unofficial but common abbreviation. Therefore, the .st extension is used by some small businesses located in Styria.

South Tyrol 
Also some registrations in South Tyrol, an autonomous, chiefly German-speaking Italian province, use the .st extension to abbreviate Südtirol, its German name.

Stockholm 
There is limited usage of .st in Stockholm, Sweden, by smaller businesses and private people. Falck Emergency in Stockholm uses .st for all their employees in the ambulance service of the Swedish capital Stockholm. Since 2018 the city has its own top level domain, .stockholm.

Telstra 
Australia's Telstra, uses tel.st as a shortcut to its main website. The shortcut is occasionally used for marketing purposes.

Australia Post 
Australia Post uses mypo.st as a shortcut to its site when sending SMS alerts.

Washington Post 
The U.S. newspaper The Washington Post uses wapo.st (along with wapo.com) as a shortcut redirect to their main URL washingtonpost.com

Meta Quest 
Meta leverages the domain metaque.st as a shortcut to their online store, which features their "Quest" line of virtual reality products.

References

External links 
 IANA .st whois information

Country code top-level domains
Communications in São Tomé and Príncipe
Computer-related introductions in 1997

sv:Toppdomän#S